St James' Church is in the village of Arnside, Cumbria, England.  It is an active Anglican parish church in the deanery of Kendal, the archdeaconry of Westmorland and Furness, and the diocese of Carlisle.

History

The church originated as a small building consisting of a nave and chancel, built in 1864–66, and designed by Miles Thompson.  It was extended towards the west in 1884 by Stephen Shaw, further enlarged to the north in 1905 by R. Morton Rigg.  A south aisle was added in 1912–14 by the Lancaster architects Austin and Paley.

Architecture

The plan of the church includes a nave with a clerestory, a lean-to north aisle, a south aisle under its own roof, and a chancel.  Arising from the roof of the south aisle is a pair of dormers, one higher than the other.  Inside the church, the north arcade is carried on octagonal piers, and the south arcade on taller round piers.  The stained glass in the east window dates from 1880 and was designed by F. Burrow of Milnthorpe.  The two-manual pipe organ was built in about 1920 by Hope-Jones, and refurbished in 1993 by M. Fletcher of Halifax.

See also

List of ecclesiastical works by Austin and Paley (1895–1914)

References

External links
Visit Cumbria: with photographs of the church

Church of England church buildings in Cumbria
Diocese of Carlisle
Gothic Revival church buildings in England
Gothic Revival architecture in Cumbria
Austin and Paley buildings
Saint James' Church